Andrée Maillet (June 7, 1921 – December 3, 1995), was a Quebec writer.

Biography
The daughter of Corinne Dupuis and Roger Maillet, she was born in Montreal and began writing by the age of eleven. Maillet began a career in journalism and, from 1943 to 1952, was a correspondent in the United States and Europe. She was a member of the Anglo-American Press Association of Paris for a number of years. From 1952 to 1960, she was director of the magazine Amérique française. She wrote for Photo-Journal and was a columnist for the Petit Journal which was owned by her father. Maillet founded the French-Canadian chapter of the PEN club. She ran as a candidate for the Rassemblement pour l'Indépendance Nationale in the Westmount provincial riding in 1966, placing fourth.

Maillet married Loyd Hamlyn Hobden. She died in Montreal at the age of 74.

Awards and honours
In 1990, she received the Prix Athanase-David. Maillet was named to the Académie des lettres du Québec in 1974 and was named an officer in the Order of Canada in 1978. In 1991, she was named a Grand Officer in the National Order of Quebec.

Selected works 
 Les Montréalais, stories (1963)
 Le chêne des tempêtes (1965), received the first prize for literature from the Province of Québec, youth section, and the medal of the Canadian Association of Children's Librarians
 Le Chant de l'Iroquoise, poetry (1967)
 Profil de l'orignal, novel (1952)
 Les Remparts de Québec, novel (1964)
 À la mémoire d'un héros, novel (1975)
 Lettres au surhomme (two volumes) novel (1976-1977)

References 

1921 births
1995 deaths
Canadian poets in French
Canadian novelists in French
Journalists from Montreal
Officers of the Order of Canada
Grand Officers of the National Order of Quebec
Canadian women novelists
Canadian women poets
Canadian women journalists
20th-century Canadian novelists
20th-century Canadian poets
20th-century Canadian women writers
Writers from Montreal
Women in Quebec politics
Canadian women non-fiction writers